Fleetwood is a fishing and market town within the Wyre district of Lancashire, England, lying at the northwest corner of the Fylde coast. All of the 44 listed buildings are recorded in the National Heritage List for England at Grade II.

Fleetwood is a planned town of the Victorian era. In 1836, local landowner and Preston MP Peter Hesketh employed architect Decimus Burton to design the new town. Burton planned the town so that the main streets radiated from a slightly raised piece of land in the centre called the Mount. The Mount was topped with a pagoda designed by Burton. The pagoda no longer exists but its replacement, a pavilion built in 1902, is listed at Grade II.

In the United Kingdom, the term "listed building" refers to a building or other structure officially designated as being of special architectural, historical or cultural significance. These buildings are in three grades: Grade I consists of buildings of outstanding architectural or historical interest; Grade II* includes particularly significant buildings of more than local interest; Grade II consists of buildings of special architectural or historical interest. Buildings in England are listed by the Secretary of State for Culture, Media and Sport on recommendations provided by English Heritage, which also determines the grading.

Key

Listed buildings

See also
Listed buildings in Lancashire

References
Footnotes

Bibliography

External links

Fleetwood
Buildings and structures in Fleetwood